The 1999 Pilot Pen Tennis doubles was the doubles event of the seventeenth edition of the final tournament in the US Open Series. Alexandra Fusai and Nathalie Tauziat were the defending champions but Fusai did not compete this year. Tauziat played with Anne-Gaëlle Sidot as the fourth seed, and they were defeated in the first time by Kristine Kunce and Dominique Van Roost.

Lisa Raymond and Rennae Stubbs won the title, defeating third seeds Elena Likhovtseva and the previous year's finalist Jana Novotná in the final.

Seeds

Draw

References
 ITF doubles results page
 WTA draw archive

Doubles
Pilot Pen Tennis - Doubles
1999 Pilot Pen Tennis